The Abbey DLD Colleges Group is a group of independent sixth form colleges based in the United Kingdom, in London, Manchester, and Cambridge. The colleges are operated by the Alpha Plus Group. London and Cambridge have new campuses.

The oldest College, Davies Laing and Dick College (DLD), was established in 1931. After 10 years located in Marylebone, the College merged with its younger sister Abbey College and moved in 2015 to a new facility in Lambeth. DLD College London has 21st century teaching facilities and a secure, on-site student Boarding House.

Abbey College Cambridge opened in 1994.  In 2015/2016 academic year, 61% of students in Cambridge centre got A*-A grades.

As a provider of A Level and GCSE education since 1990,  Abbey College Manchester also offers International Foundation Programme pathways in Business, Science, Engineering, Humanities and Creative Arts. There are three major faculties within the college – Science & Mathematics, Arts & Humanities, and Languages & International Studies. Manchester campus is based in the heart of the city centre. Mr Chris Randell is the principal.

Locations
 DLD College London, Westminster Bridge Road
 Abbey College Birmingham closed 2016
 Abbey College Cambridge
 Abbey College Manchester

References

External links 

Abbey DLD Colleges Group website

Sixth form colleges in England